South Bank railway station is located on the Gold Coast line in Brisbane, Queensland, Australia. It is one of two stations serving the South Brisbane area, the other being South Brisbane station. It was formerley known as Vulture Street station due to being located on Vulture Street.

History
South Bank station opened as Vulture Street, after the adjoining street. The station provides access to the park and cinemas, and the Grey Street retail and dining precinct.

In September 1930, the standard gauge New South Wales North Coast line opened to the west of the station. In 1995, as part of the construction of the Gold Coast line, the standard gauge line was converted to dual gauge.

On 27 April 2001, the station was renamed South Bank (Vulture Street), later being simplified to South Bank in reference to its proximity to the South Bank Parklands. At the same time a platform face was added on the dual gauge line.

In December 2013, work commenced on a transit oriented development at South Bank, which will see the station covered with office and apartment buildings. The new apartments are called Southpoint. The proposal was announced by the Queensland Government in November 2007.

Services
South Bank station is served by Beenleigh, Cleveland and Gold Coast line services.

Services by platform

Transport links
Adjacent to the station lies the South Bank busway station that is served by Brisbane Transport services.

References

External links

South Bank station Queensland Rail
South Bank station Queensland's Railways on the Internet
Track layout SA Track & Signal

Railway stations in Brisbane
South Brisbane, Queensland